DeWayne Stephen "Blackbyrd" McKnight (born April 17, 1954) is an American guitarist. He was a member of The Headhunters, a jazz-funk fusion band from 1975 through 1978 and Parliament-Funkadelic from 1978 through 2008.  He served briefly as guitarist for the Red Hot Chili Peppers after the death of Hillel Slovak in 1988 before being replaced by John Frusciante. He also played briefly with Miles Davis in 1986.

Selected discography

1973 Charles Lloyd – Geeta
1975 Herbie Hancock – Flood
1975 The Headhunters – Survival of the Fittest
1977 The Headhunters – Straight from the Gate
1979 Funkadelic – Uncle Jam Wants You
1979 Parliament – Gloryhallastoopid
1979 The Brides of Funkenstein – Never Buy Texas from a Cowboy
1981 Funkadelic – The Electric Spanking of War Babies
1983 	 George Clinton – You Shouldn't-Nuf Bit Fish
1983 P-Funk All-Stars – Urban Dancefloor Guerillas
1985 	 George Clinton – Some of My Best Jokes Are Friends
1985 Jimmy G and the Tackheads – Federation of Tackheads
1986 	 George Clinton – R&B Skeletons in the Closet
1988 INCorporated Thang Band – Lifestyles of the Roach and Famous
1989 	 George Clinton – The Cinderella Theory
1990 Mr. Fiddler – With Respect
1990 P-Funk All-Stars – Live at the Beverly Theater
1992 Foley – 7 Years Ago...Directions in Smart-Alec Music
1993 	 George Clinton – Hey Man, Smell My Finger
1993 	 Parliament-Funkadelic/P-Funk All-Stars – Dope Dogs
1993 George Clinton and the P-Funk All-Stars- Go Fer Yer Funk
1994 Red Hot Chili Peppers- Out in L.A. appears on the song "Blues for Meister"
1994 P-Funk Guitar Army – Tributes to Jimi Hendrix
1995 Parliament-Funkadelic/P-Funk All-Stars – Police Doggy
1995 Axiom Funk – Funkcronomicon
1996 George Clinton and the P-Funk All-Stars – T.A.P.O.A.F.O.M.
2005 George Clinton and the P-Funk All-Stars – How Late Do U Have 2BB4UR Absent?
2007 Funkadelic – By Way of the Drum
2008 Fred Hamm – "Free Music Reunion" appears on the song "Wanna"
2009    'Bout Funkin' Time—Solo Album
2014 Funkadelic – "First Ya Gotta Shake the Gate"
2018 Parliament – "Medicaid Fraud Dogg"

References 

1954 births
Living people
American funk guitarists
American male guitarists
P-Funk members
Red Hot Chili Peppers members
African-American rock musicians
Guitarists from Los Angeles
20th-century American guitarists
The Headhunters members
African-American guitarists